The Trial of the Six (Díki ton Éxi) or the Execution of the Six was the trial for treason, in late 1922, of the Anti-Venizelist officials held responsible for the Greek military defeat in Asia Minor. The trial culminated in the death sentence and execution of six of the nine defendants.

Background

On September 9, 1922, Turkish military and guerilla forces entered the city of Smyrna (now İzmir), in Asia Minor, which was previously occupied by Greece by the Treaty of Sèvres. Hundreds of thousands of Greek residents from Asia Minor fled to Smyrna seeking transportation across the sea to escape the advancing Turks.  The pro-royalist government in Athens lost control of the situation and could only watch as the events unfolded. The retreating Greek "Army of the East" abandoned Smyrna on September 8, the day before the Turkish Army moved in. Transportation arrived late and in too small numbers relative to the number of people trying to flee, resulting in chaos and panic. In a chaotic and bloody battle which would come to be known as the "Greco-Turkish War", Greece lost the Asia Minor land mandate to Turkey. Those who survived the bloody evacuation of the area would spend the rest of their lives as refugees.(Greek: Μικρασιατική Καταστροφή, Mikrasiatiki Katastrophi).

Coup

Anti-royalist factions,  seizing the moment of public outrage, moved against the Pro-Royalist government and a military coup d'état unfolded in Athens and the Aegean Islands. Backed by an angry civil response to the defeat in the fields of battle, on September 11, 1922, Colonels Nikolaos Plastiras and Stylianos Gonatas formed a "Revolutionary Committee" that demanded the abdication of King Constantine (considered responsible for the defeat). They demanded as well the resignation of the royalist government, and the punishment of those responsible for the military disaster. The coup was aided by venizelist General Theodoros Pangalos, then stationed in Athens. Backed by massive demonstrations in the capital, the coup was successful: two days later, on September 13, when Plastiras and Gonatas disembarked in the port of Laurium with the military units they commanded, King Constantine abdicated on September 27 in favour of his first-born son, George and sailed for Sicily, where he died four months later. The government ministers were arrested and the new king consented to a new administration, one favorable to the coup.

Trial

On October 12, 1922, the junta constituted an "extraordinary military tribunal", which convened on October 31 and carried out a two-week-long trial in which the five most senior members of the overthrown administration (Dimitrios Gounaris, Georgios Baltatzis (el), Nikolaos Stratos, Nikolaos Theotokis (el), and Petros Protopapadakis) and General Georgios Hatzianestis (last commander-in-chief of the Asia Minor campaign) were tried for high treason, convicted, and sentenced to death. They were executed a few hours after the verdict was handed down, and before its publication on November 28, 1922 (November 15 on the "old style" Greek calendar in use at the time). According to the decision, the six with their support for the return of exiled Constantine to the throne and with their decisions during the war against Kemal, damaged the national interests and strained the relations with the Allies, leading the country to the defeat. The decision was previously taken to the office of Plastiras, "leader of the revolution" to sign. When the decision was published it started with "In the name of the King of Greeks George II".

Two defendants, Admiral Michail Goudas (el) and General Xenophon Stratigos, received a life imprisonment sentence.  The ex-king's brother, Prince Andrew, also a senior commanding officer in the failed campaign, had been indicted as well but was in Corfu at the time.  He was arrested, transported to Athens, tried by the same tribunal a few days later, and found guilty of the same crimes and sentenced to death. His sentence was then mitigated to banishment from Greece for life as he was found to be "completely lacking in high military command experience" (Greek: "της τελείας απειρίας περί την διοίκησιν ανωτέρων μονάδων"). The prince and his family (which included his infant son  – carried in a wooden vegetable crate – Prince Philip, later the Duke of Edinburgh) were evacuated on the British warship, HMS Calypso on December 4, leaving Corfu island for Brindisi.

Punishments

Aftermath
The embassies of Sweden, Netherlands and United Kingdom objected and tried to cancel the punishments without success. After the executions, and in response, the United Kingdom withdrew its ambassador to Greece for some time.

The executions were a kind of shock for the Greek conservatives, while they exacerbated the conflict between the royalists and the liberals the next decades, at least until the establishment of the 4th of August Regime.

In 1932, during a speech in parliament, Prime Minister Venizelos supported that the victims were indeed not guilty "for treason", but he couldn't and wouldn't condemn any revolutionary officers of the military tribune, because they acted in patriotic and virtuous way.

Overturned
In 2010, Greek courts annulled the convictions due to new evidence and then also dismissed the charges for high treason for the six due to the limitation period. Former prime minister Petros Protopapadakis’ grandson was able to present new evidence in court that had been absent in the 1922 trial and which was deemed sufficient for a retrial.

The lawsuit to overturn the previous convictions for high treason was made in an effort to rewrite school textbooks that had been unfair to the six and promote the belief that the six had been scapegoats to appease public anger at the humiliation that the Greeks had suffered in the Asia Minor Catastrophe and that the six, who had no desire to see Greek forces defeated, had been in reality just victims of circumstances they were unable to control.

References

History of Greece (1909–1924)
1922 in Greece
Greco-Turkish War (1919–1922)
Modern history of Athens
Trials in Greece